Florian Stofer (born 25 June 1981) is a Swiss former rower. He competed at the 2004 Summer Olympics and the 2012 Summer Olympics.

References

External links
 

1981 births
Living people
Swiss male rowers
Olympic rowers of Switzerland
Rowers at the 2004 Summer Olympics
Rowers at the 2012 Summer Olympics
People from Sursee District
Sportspeople from the canton of Lucerne